Shams-e Bala (also Romanized as Shams-e Bālā; also known as Shams-e ‘Olyā) is a village in Khusf Rural District, Central District, Khusf County, South Khorasan Province, Iran. At the 2006 census, its population was 63, in 20 families.

References 

Populated places in Khusf County